Switzer is the surname of the following people

Barbara Switzer (born 1940), English trade unionist
Barry Switzer (born 1937), American football coach
Bill Switzer (born 1984), Canadian actor
Bob Switzer (1914–1997), American inventor of fluorescent paint
Carl Switzer (1927–1959), American actor and singer
Carroll O. Switzer (1908–1960), American judge and politician
George Switzer (born 1973), English football player
George Switzer (mineralogist) (1915–2008), American mineralogist
Harold Switzer (1925–1967), American child actor and child singer
Jon Switzer (born 1979), baseball player
Kathrine Switzer (born 1947), American author
Kyle Switzer (born 1985), Canadian actor
Mary E. Switzer (1900–1971), American social reformer
Michael Switzer, American film and television director
Peter Switzer (born 1954), Australian business and financial commentator
Richard Switzer (born 1995), American film producer
Rick Switzer (born 1944), Canadian sculptor
Robert M. Switzer (1863–1952), American politician from Ohio
Ryan Switzer (born 1994), American football player
Stephen Switzer (1682–1745), English garden designer and writer
Tom Switzer (born 1971), Australian newspaper editor
Veryl Switzer (born 1932), American football player
William Switzer (1920–1969), Canadian politician from Alberta

Ethnonymic surnames